Jan Dost (born 1965) is a Syrian Kurdish poet, writer and translator. He has written several novels in Kurdish and Arabic and is one of the prolific Kurdish writers. He was born on 12 March 1965 in Kobanî, Syria. Jan Dost is a recipient of the Galawej Award (a prize in Kurdish literature). Jan Dost has also translated several Kurdish and Persian works into the Arabic language, including Mem and Zin, one of the most famous Kurdish works, written by Ahmad Khani.

Works

Novels
 Mijabad (in Kurdish). Diyarbakir 2004
 Sê gav û sê darek (in Kurdish). Avesta, Istanbul 2007
 Mîrname (in Kurdish). Avesta, Istanbul 2008
 Martînê Bextewer (in Kurdish). Avesta, Istanbul 2011
 Asheeq the Translator (عشيق المترجم, in Arabic). Waraq Publishing, Dubai 2013
 Blood on the Minaret (دم على المئذنة, in Arabic). Maqam, Kairo 2013
 The Bells of Rome (نواقيس روما, in Arabic). Dar Al-Saqi, Beirut 2017
 Kobani (in Kurdish) Dara, Diyarbakir 2017
 a safe Korridor (ممر آمن in Arabic). Miskiliani, Tunis 2019
 A Green Bus leaving Aleppo, ( باص أخضر يغادر حلب In Arabic). Al Mutawaset, Milano 2019
 The manuscript of Petersburg. ( مخطوط بطرسبورغ in Arabic) Miskiliani, Tunis 2020
 Cordyceps. (الكوردي سيبس in Arabic). Damascus. 2020

Translations
 Mem and Zin (from Kurdish into Arabic). Damaskus 1995. Duhok 2016. Kairo 2016

Poetry
 Dîwana Jan. Avesta, Istanbul 2008
 Kela Dimdimê. Bonn 1991; Istanbul 2008
 A Song for Kurdistan's Eyes (in Kurdish). Syria 1996
 Poems which the War has Forgotten in the Poet's Pocket. (in Arabic). Amman. 2019

References

 Jan Dost and his work in Alabjad (Arabic)
 SBS; Interview with the Kurdish writer Jan Dost
 Jordi, T. (2009). "Syria's Kurds, History, Politics and Society," Routledge, US. .
 Khal Khaleej Times; Kalima publishes Arabic version of Kurdish book

Kurdish writers
Living people
1965 births